Calamotropha discellus is a moth in the family Crambidae. It was described by the British entomologist, Francis Walker in 1863. It is found in Madagascar, South Africa and Gambia.

References

Crambinae
Moths described in 1863